The Five storied stone pagoda of Jeongnimsa Temple site is a five-story pagoda standing on a single narrow and low base pedestal. It was built in the Baekje Era.

Origin 
On the first floor of this stone pagoda, it is referred to as the Pyeongsung Tower of Baekje. Recently, a tile engraved with the temple name Jungrimsa was found at this temple site and the site was named Jeongnimsa Temple Site.

Configuration 
Each pedestal is fixed by a pillar stone. Each corner of the pagoda body in each story holds a pillar stone using the beheullim technique, where a pillar's upper and lower extremities are narrow while its middle is convex. Thin and wide roof stones covering the edges of the eaves display what is described as "lofty elegance."

Value 
It is valued in that it shows refined and creative figures as well as the typical form of a wooden building like a thin pedestal, with pillars exhibiting the beheullim technique and thin and wide roof stones. The pagoda is also highly valued as one of the two last remaining stone pagodas from the Baekje Era.

Characteristics 
The surface of the stone pagoda is engraved with Chinese characters celebrating the victory of the Tang dynasty over Baekje in 660, indicating the symbolic importance of its location for Baekje. It was carved into the pagoda itself by the commanding Tang general who defeated Baekje once and for all during the Baekje–Tang War. The Tang dynasty and Silla kingdom joined forces to destroy Baekje.

See also
National Treasures of South Korea
Baekje
Korean Buddhist sculpture
Korean Buddhism

References

External links
Cultural Heritage Administration of Korea 

Korean pagodas
Stone pagodas
Buildings and structures in South Chungcheong Province
National Treasures of South Korea
Three Kingdoms of Korea
Tourist attractions in South Chungcheong Province
Pagodas in South Korea